O Stratis parastratise (translation: Stratis went astray) is a 1969 Greek black and white comedy starring Dinos Iliopoulos, Anna Fonsou and Nikos Rizos.  The film sold 259,606 tickets.

Plot

Stratis (Dinos Iliopoulos), after many years of laborious work, publishes his treatise on Aspasia's role in the Peloponnesian Wars.  A team of American  film producers approaches him to get the movie rights, planning to use his scientific work for a historical parody.  At first he rejects their offer, but finally life's demands and his debts to his relatives compel him to accept.  At the same time he falls in love with his cinematic heroine (Anna Fonsou).  In the end after the completion of the shooting of the film, his luck changes and he is able to return to his old ways.

Cast
Dinos Iliopoulos ..... Stratis Damalakis
Anna Fonzou ..... Dora Galati
Nikos Rizos ..... Jim Andrews
Anna Mantzourani ..... Dimitroula Damalaki
Dimos Starenios ..... Leon Antypas
Kaiti Lambropoulou ..... Alexandra
Nelli Papa ..... Athina Xenaki
Giouli Stamoulaki ..... Thaleia Moschou
Nikos Kapios ..... Petros Krokidas
Giorgos Messalas ..... Byron
Giorgos Grigoriou ..... Athinodoros
Giorgos Papazisis ..... shoemaker
Andonis Papadopoulos ..... kiosk owner

See also
List of Greek films

External links

1969 films
Greek comedy films
1960s Greek-language films
1969 comedy films